The Orangeburg Dodgers were a minor league baseball team based in Orangeburg, South Carolina that played in the Western Carolinas League in 1974. They were an affiliate of the Los Angeles Dodgers and were managed by Bart Shirley. They finished in 4th place with a 63-71 record in their single season of play.

The team had played in 1973 as the Orangeburg Cardinals, a co-op team featuring players from multiple franchises. The first Orangeburg team was the Orangeburg Cotton Pickers, who played as members of the South Carolina League from 1906 to 1908.

References

External links
Baseball Reference

Los Angeles Dodgers minor league affiliates
Defunct Western Carolinas League teams
Defunct minor league baseball teams
Professional baseball teams in South Carolina
Defunct baseball teams in South Carolina
Baseball teams disestablished in 1974
Baseball teams established in 1974